Mazhar Alam Miankhel (Urdu:مظهر عالم) is a Justice of the Supreme Court of Pakistan and a former Chief Justice of Peshawar High Court. He served as judge of Peshawar High Court from 2011 to 2014.

Early life and education
Justice Mazhar Alam Miankhel, was born on 14 July  1957 in DI Khan.  He graduated from Gomal University, DI Khan in 1979  and obtained his law degree from the said University in 1982.

Professional career 
Justice Miankhel joined the lower courts as a lawyer  in 1982 and two years later became advocate  of  High court. He was elevated as a Supreme Court advocate in 2003. During his career, Justice Miankhel has served on various judicial and administrative committees as well as the vice president and secretary of the DI Khan district bar association. He also taught as a part-time lecturer at Gomal University’s law college from 1998–2000.

Judicial career 
Mazhar Alam was  promoted to the PHC bench as an additional judge in 2009 and made permanent judge  in 2011.  He was appointed as Chief Justice  of  the Peshawar High Court On 8 April 2014 following the retirement of  Justice Fasihul Mulk.

Mazhar Alam has issued a number of controversial decisions against PTI. He favoured the view that parliamentary members of PTI who turned against their political party should not lose their membership. He is the only Supreme Court judge who has advocated initiating a case for treason against former Prime Minister Imran Khan, on flimsy grounds.

References 

Pakistani judges
People from Dera Ismail Khan District
1957 births
Living people
Justices of the Supreme Court of Pakistan
Chief Justices of the Peshawar High Court
Gomal University alumni